"Golden Years" is the sixth episode of the second series of British comedy anthology series Comedy Lab. It first aired on 8 September 1999 on Channel 4. Written by Ricky Gervais and Stephen Merchant, it stars Gervais as the co-owner of a video rental company who has a David Bowie obsession. The episode follows him as he prepares for his appearance on the talent show Stars In Their Eyes.

Production

Plot

Gervais plays Clive Meadows, the main character who has a David Bowie obsession. Clive Meadows is the 32 (or 37, he is somewhat unclear) year old co-owner of 'Video Zone', a video rental company based in Reading. The show follows Clive as he prepares for his appearance on the ITV talent show Stars In Their Eyes.

Reception

Legacy
The documentary style of the show and in particular the behaviour of Gervais' character present like prototypes for The Office and its lead character David Brent.

References

External links
 "Golden Years" at channel4.com
 

1999 British television episodes
Comedy television episodes
Ricky Gervais